The Democratic Alliance of Croats in Vojvodina (DSHV; ; ДСХВ) is a political party in Serbia representing the Croat ethnic minority in the province of Vojvodina.

History 
Over time, some party members were unsatisfied with party's policy, so they separated and formed new Croat parties:
 Hrvatski narodni savez (Croatian National Alliance) – in 1998 (this fraction has been reincorporated into DSHV on February 29, 2004)
 Hrvatska bunjevačko-šokačka stranka (Croatian Bunjevac-Šokac Party)
 Demokratska zajednica Hrvata (Democratic Union of Croats) – in 2007

In 2009 DSHV negotiated with another ethnic Croat party from Syrmia region of Vojvodina, the Hrvatska srijemska inicijativa / Hrvatska sremska inicijativa (Croatian Syrmian Initiative). It was planned that HSI and DSHV unite on June 5, 2009 on the meeting in Sremska Mitrovica.

It has occasionally condemned attacks by Serbian nationalists, and it has issued protests over ethnic assimilation. It is also supportive of further autonomism.

List of presidents 
Bela Tonković (1990–2003)
Petar Kuntić (2003–2015)
Tomislav Žigmanov (2015–present)

Electoral performance

Parliamentary elections

References

External links 
  
 
 
 

Croats of Vojvodina
Croat political parties in Serbia
Politics of Vojvodina
Political parties established in 1990
1990 establishments in Serbia
Political parties in Yugoslavia